Joel P. Engardio is an American politician, writer, and public-safety advocate. He is the supervisor for District 4 of San Francisco, California, serving since 2023 after unseating incumbent Gordon Mar in the 2022 San Francisco Board of Supervisors election.

Early life and education 
Engardio is a native of Saginaw, Michigan, where he attended Arthur Hill High School.

Engardio graduated with a bachelor's in journalism from Michigan State University and a Master of Public Administration from the Harvard Kennedy School of Government.

Media career 
Engardio is a former journalist. He moved to San Francisco in 1998 to cover Tom Ammiano's mayoral campaign during the 1999 San Francisco mayoral election.

Engardio and Tom Shepard directed the documentary Knocking about Jehovah's Witnesses.

San Francisco Board of Supervisors 
Engardio ran three failed campaigns for District 7 supervisor in 2012, 2016, and 2020.

Engardio ran for District 4 supervisor after his neighborhood was redistricted from District 7. He was elected in November 2022, unseating incumbent Gordon Mar by a margin of 50.9% to 49.1%. Engardio is the first gay supervisor elected to represent the city's westside.

Political stances 
Engardio is categorized as a moderate. Engardio supported the 2022 recall of San Francisco District Attorney Chesa Boudin and the 2022 recall of three San Francisco Board of Education commissioners.

Personal life 
When he was elected to supervisor, Engardio lived in the Lakeshore neighborhood of San Francisco. He was raised a Jehovah's Witness, however he does not identify with the religion.

Engardio is gay. He has been married to Lionel Hsu since 2015.

References

External links 
 
 Campaign website

Living people
San Francisco Board of Supervisors members
21st-century American politicians
Harvard Kennedy School alumni
Michigan State University alumni
American LGBT city council members
LGBT people from San Francisco
1972 births